Gerdi E. Lipschutz (April 30, 1923 – November 19, 2010) was an American politician from New York.

Life
She was born on April 30, 1923, in Germany. She went to the United States in 1937. She married Sam Lipschutz, and they had two children. They lived in Rockaway Park, Queens.

Gerdi Lipschutz was a Democrat. In June 1974, she was appointed by Mayor Abraham Beame as Executive Director of the Voluntary Action Center.

On February 10, 1976, she was elected to the New York State Assembly, to fill the vacancy caused by the election of Herbert A. Posner to the New York City Civil Court. She was re-elected several times, and remained in the Assembly until 1987, sitting in the 181st, 182nd, 183rd, 184th, 185th, 186th and 187th New York State Legislatures.

In January 1987, she was the subject of an inquiry by the Assembly Ethics and Guidance Committee. Lipschutz had hired two secretaries who were paid with money from the Assembly, but did not work for her. They worked in the law office of Richard L. Rubin, a Democratic boss of Queens. Lipschutz testified under an immunity agreement against Rubin who was prosecuted in the United States District Court for the Eastern District of New York. On March 3, 1987, the Ethics Committee debated the issue behind closed doors, but it was leaked that they would recommend that Lipschutz be censured. Lipschutz resigned her seat on March 9, before a vote on the findings of the Ethics Committee could be taken.

She died on November 19, 2010, in Sarasota, Florida.

References

1923 births
2010 deaths
People from Queens, New York
Women state legislators in New York (state)
Democratic Party members of the New York State Assembly
Public officeholders of Rockaway, Queens
German emigrants to the United States
21st-century American women